London Bridge City Pier (also known as London Bridge Pier and City Pier) is situated on the south bank of the River Thames in London, UK, close to London Bridge. It serves as the main pier for the City of London and City Hall, former headquarters of the London Assembly.

The pier is also close to Hay's Galleria, HMS Belfast and Borough Market and the Shard.

Services
London Bridge City Pier is served by the Thames commuter catamaran service run by Thames Clippers. Boats run regularly from Embankment and the London Eye, and on to Tower Millennium Pier, Canary Wharf the O2 and Woolwich Arsenal Pier.

Connections
 London Bridge station   
London Bridge bus station

Gallery

External links

Thames Clippers
London River Services

London River Services
Transport in the London Borough of Southwark
Piers in London